The Kamdini–Gulu Road, also known as the Gulu–Kamdini Road, is a road in the Northern Region of Uganda, connecting the town of Kamdini with Gulu, the largest city in the Northern Region.

Location
The road is part of the Kampala to Juba transportation corridor. The coordinates of the road near Parlenga are 2°34'37.0"N, 32°21'14.0" (Latitude:2.576944; Longitude:32.353896).

Upgrading to bitumen
The government of Uganda earmarked this road for upgrading through the conversion of the existing gravel road to bitumen surface and the building of bridges and drainage channels. The contract was awarded to the China Communications Construction Company at a budgeted cost of USh62 billion. Work commenced in April 2014, with completion expected in 2016.

See also
 List of roads in Uganda
 Transportation in Uganda
 Economy of Uganda
 Uganda National Roads Authority

References

External links
 Uganda National Road Authority Homepage

Roads in Uganda
Oyam District
Gulu District
Northern Region, Uganda